Tis the Season for Los Straitjackets! is the sixth studio album by American instrumental rock band Los Straitjackets, released on October 8, 2002 by Yep Roc Records. The album is a cover of traditional Christmas songs, and includes two original songs – "Christmas in Las Vegas" and "Christmas Weekend".

Track listing

Personnel
Los Straitjackets
Danny Amis – guitar
Eddie Angel – guitar
Pete Curry – bass, engineering, mixing
Jimmy Lester – drums
Scott Esbeck – bass
Additional personnel
Mark Linnett – production, engineering
Dennis Moody – mixing
Jim DeMain – mastering
Mary Gunn – artwork

References

Los Straitjackets albums
2002 Christmas albums
Christmas albums by American artists
Covers albums
Yep Roc Records albums
Albums produced by Mark Linett